The English women's cricket team toured Australia in February 2003, where Australia were defending the Women's Ashes. The two sides had just played in a ODI quadrangular tournament in New Zealand, the 2002–03 World Series of Women's Cricket, which was won by Australia. Australia won the first test by five wickets, whilst the second test was drawn after being heavily affected by rain. Australia therefore retained the Ashes.

Squads

Tour matches

2-day match: Australia Under-23s v England

Test series

1st Test

2nd Test

See also
 2002–03 World Series of Women's Cricket

References

External links
England Women tour of Australia 2002/03 from Cricinfo

International cricket competitions in 2003
The Women's Ashes
Australia 2003
Women's international cricket tours of Australia
2003 in women's cricket